Hojjatabad (also Romanized as Ḩojjatābād)  was a village in Ayask Rural District, in the Central District of Sarayan County, South Khorasan Province, Iran. At the 2006 census, its population was 103, in 28 families.

References 

Populated places in Sarayan County